The 91st Air Landing Division (German 91. Luftlande-Infanterie-Division) was a German Army infantry division in World War II.

History 

The division was originally formed as an air landing division (Luftlandedivision) trained and equipped to be transported by aircraft (i.e. having only light artillery and few heavy support weapons) to take part in Operation Tanne Ost, an aborted airborne operation in Scandinavia. Despite its name, the 91st in practice was a regular Heer unit and spent its entire existence as a conventional infantry division.

Formed in the Baumholder area from replacement center personnel in January 1944 under the command of Generalleutnant Bruno Ortner, its command was transferred to Generalleutnant Wilhelm Falley and moved to the Cotentin peninsula with von der Heydte's 6th Parachute Regiment and 100th Panzer Replacement and Training Battalion, armed with captured French light tanks, attached as part of the German 7th Army.

Located within the landing zones of both the U.S. 82nd and 101st Airborne Divisions, it saw heavy fighting around Sainte-Marie-du-Mont with its divisional commander being killed.

Placed under the temporary command of Generalmajor Bernard Klosterkemper, It attempted to block the U.S. 4th Infantry Division's advance off Utah Beach at Carentan where its 1058th Grenadier Regiment was all but destroyed. After the second week of the Allied invasion of Normandy the 91st had suffered so many casualties it was no longer considered combat effective as a unit.

Now at battle group strength, it was attached to the 77th Infantry Division then to the 243rd Infantry Division in Corps von Schlieban defending Cherbourg where most of its remaining forces were captured by the Americans. Remnants of the division under the command of Colonel Eugen Konig escaped to the south. Despite recommendation the unit be dissolved Oberkommando des Heer (OKH) chose to rebuild it adding replacement battalions and sending it back to the front in early August.

Defending Rennes from Lieutenant General George S. Patton's U.S. Third Army, it again suffered heavy casualties and was reduced to battle group strength. It followed the German retreat to the Siegfried Line and was later consolidated with the remains of the 275th and 344th Infantry Divisions to form the 344th Volksgrenadier Division.

Commanders 
Generalleutnant Bruno Ortner (10 February 1944 – 25 April 1944)
Generalleutnant Wilhelm Falley (25 April 1944 – 6 June 1944) KIA
Generalmajor Bernhard Klosterkemper (6 June 1944 – 10 June 1944)
Generalleutnant Eugen König (10 June 1944 – 10 August 1944)

Organization (June 1944) 
Command
1057th Grenadier Regiment
1058th Grenadier Regiment
191st Mountain Artillery Regiment
191st Engineer Battalion
191st Anti-tank Company
191st Field Replacement Battalion
191st Anti-aircraft Company
191st Signals Battalion
6th Parachute Regiment (attached from the 2nd Parachute Division)
100th Panzer Replacement and Training Battalion (attached)

References 
 
 Pipes, Jason. "91.Infanterie-Division".
 Wendel, Marcus (2004). "91. Luftlande Infanterie-Division".
 "91. Infanterie-Division / 91. (LL) Infanterie-Division". German language article at www.lexikon-der-wehrmacht.de. Retrieved 7 April 2005.
 Mitcham, Samuel (1985). Hitlers Legions The German Army Order of Battle

Infantry091
Military units and formations established in 1944
9*91
Military units and formations disestablished in 1944